Preston B. Henn (January 20, 1931 – April 30, 2017) was an American entrepreneur who founded the Fort Lauderdale Swap Shop in 1963.

Business career
Henn opened what became the Swap Shop as a drive-in movie theater in 1963. He shortly thereafter decided to add a flea market. Through shrewd business practices and somewhat extravagant promotion, Henn was able to grow the Fort Lauderdale Swap Shop into one of the region's most popular tourist attractions. Throughout its drive-in theater ownership, he owned 3 drive-in theaters in the state of Florida. In 2005 Henn began making unusual decisions such as firing the facility's trademark circus act, and it was rumored he was selling the facility. Later that year he was involved in a violent altercation with a vendor he was trying to evict. Police used a taser to subdue him. Henn was subsequently sent to a mental hospital for again attempting to assault the vendor.

Racing career
In 1983, Henn, along with co-drivers A. J. Foyt, Bob Wollek, and Claude Ballot-Lena drove his Porsche 935 to victory in the 24 Hours of Daytona. The following year Henn's Porsche 956 driven by John Paul Jr. and Jean Rondeau placed second in the 24 Hours of Le Mans, two laps behind the winning 956 of Henri Pescarolo and Klaus Ludwig. Henn, driving with Michel Ferté and Edgar Dören, failed to finish in their Porsche 962 after ignition failure while on lap 247 (Pescarolo/Ludwig covered 360 laps). Driving in the IMSA GTP class, Henn's brand new 962 was the first time the new model was raced at Le Mans. There was another Porsche 962 in the Group C class run for British team John Fitzpatrick Racing, though it was a converted 956, making the white Swap Shop Porsche the first true 962 to race at Le Mans.

Henn himself made five starts at Le Mans with a best finish of 10th in 1983. His Porsche 962 driven by Foyt and Wollek won the 1985 12 Hours of Sebring.

Henn also participated in offshore powerboat racing. He inexplicably ceased all racing activities a few years later and subsequently refused to discuss his racing career. Despite this, Henn still maintained an extensive exotic car collection both in his private estate and on display at the Swap Shop and was a participant of the Ferrari FXX program. His 1964 Ferrari 275 GTB/C Speciale could become the first car to sell for more than $100 million.

Personal life and death
In 2013, Henn was the first person to buy a Gulfstream G650.

In 2016, he filed suit against Ferrari for damages in the United States District Court, Southern District of Florida, Fort Lauderdale Division.  His complaint alleges his reputation as a Ferrari collector has been damaged as he was not selected by Ferrari to purchase a LaFerrari Aperta.

Henn died April 30, 2017 at his home, survived by his wife of over 60 years, Betty.  He was 86.

References

1931 births
2017 deaths
24 Hours of Le Mans drivers
American car collectors
Trans-Am Series drivers
Businesspeople from Fort Lauderdale, Florida
24 Hours of Daytona drivers
Racing drivers from Florida
Racing drivers from Miami
World Sportscar Championship drivers
People from Murphy, North Carolina
20th-century American businesspeople